Jean-Baptiste Legardeur de Repentigny, (1632-1709) was born at Thury-Harcourt in Normandy in 1632, and died in Montreal on September 9, 1709. He was esquire, midshipman, and councillor in the Conseil Souverain. He was the son of Pierre Legardeur de Repentigny and Marie Favery.

Jean-Baptiste Legardeur arrived in Canada in 1636 with his parents. He became associated with the fur trade at an early age. On October 6, 1663, he was elected the first mayor of Quebec City. He occupied this office for only one month, since the Conseil Souverain considered it unnecessary. He received from his mother the seigneury of Repentigny on May 2, 1670, which had been granted by the Compagnie de la Nouvelle France in 1647 to his father. His wife was Marguerite Nicolet, the daughter of French explorer Jean Nicolet.

References 

 

1632 births
1709 deaths
People from Thury-Harcourt
People of New France
Mayors of Quebec City